François Nicolas Voirin (1833–1885) was a French archetier (bowmaker), known in his time as the "Modern Tourte."

F.N. Voirin (the son of a gardener) was born in Paris France, the brother of Joseph Voirin (also a talented bowmaker) and cousin to Jean Baptiste Vuillaume. At age of 12, he served his apprenticeship in Mirecourt, with Jean SIMON, brother of Nicolas SIMON, also known as SIMON FR, and later worked in the workshop of Vuillaume from 1855 to 1870 where he succeeded Nicolas Maline and revolutionized bow design and construction.

After his tenure at the Vuillaume shop, he established his own business at 3 rue du Bouloi, Paris, where he worked until his sudden death. He was a prolific maker and is generally regarded as the most important bowmaker of the second half of the 19th century. His bows are of superb quality. Voirin produced a radically different bow from François Tourte; Slimmer head; the camber moved closer to head, yielding a stronger stick and reducing the thickness of the shaft especially at the heel. Primarily, Voirin made bows with the Vuillaume-style frog. The micro-photos of Vuillaume were placed mainly in bows by Voirin using the Stanhope lens.

Voirin taught Charles Peccatte (1850–1920), son of François Peccatte as well as others including Joseph Alfred Lamy also known as Lamy père, Louis and Claude Thomassin, and Charles Nicolas Bazin.

Voirin was one of the great makers of the 19th century along with his predecessors François Tourte, Dominique Peccatte, Jean Pierre Marie Persois, and Etienne Pajeot.

Though the earlier bows of Voirin were stamped with the Vuillaume brand, his later work bears his own stamp, F.N.Voirin.

"François Nicolas Voirin has had a lasting effect and influence over many generations of bowmakers. 

His bows have been used by the greatest soloists, among them Jean-Delphin Alard, Charles Dancla, Eugène Ysaÿe, Mischa Elman, Jacques Thibaud, Isaac Stern, Emanuel Feuermann, Pinchas Zukerman, William Primrose and today Jian Wang and Viktoria Mulova." — Gennady Filimonov

Quotes
"François Nicolas Voirin was the most skilled maker of his generation, one of the finest makers ever, and he produced a uniformly high quality product...The best Voirin bows are exquisite playing tools; they are strong and nimble and produce a beautiful tone. By 1880 many makers were beginning to consistently aim for an even heavier, stronger model, with varying degrees of success. Lamy père picked up where Voirin left off." — Stefan Hersh 2003

References 

 
 
 
 Les Luthiers Parisiens aux XIX et XX siecles Tom 3 "Jean-Baptiste Vuillaume et sa famille - Sylvette Milliot 2006
 
 
 François Nicolas Voirin, the master of the light violin bow: notes on his life and work
 Violins & Bows - Jost Thoene 2006

1833 births
1885 deaths
Luthiers from Paris
Bow makers
19th-century French businesspeople